Sant'Antonino is a commune in the Haute-Corse department of France on the island of Corsica. It is one of Les Plus Beaux Villages de France.

Population

See also
Communes of the Haute-Corse department

References

Communes of Haute-Corse
Plus Beaux Villages de France